Echinoplaca schizidiifera is a species of lichen in the family Gomphillaceae. It was described as new to science in 2011. It is found in Venezuela.

References

Ostropales
Lichen species
Lichens described in 2011
Lichens of Venezuela
Taxa named by Robert Lücking